Three star or three stars is a grading received in a star classification scheme. 

Three star or three stars may also refer to:

 Three Stars (Chinese constellation), a group of seven stars
 Three stars (ice hockey), triple equivalent of "man of the match" in other sports
 Three Stars (militant group), a former Tamil militant group in Sri Lanka
 Three Star Club, a Nepalese association football club
 Three Star Gods, Chinese gods of happiness, rank and longevity
 Three star petrol, a class of Leaded petrol formerly sold in the UK
 Three-star rank, a senior military rank
 Dinkus (* * *), three asterisks arranged horizontally usually indicate an omission or subsection
 Asterism (typography) (⁂), three asterisks (stars) in a triangle, uncommonly used to indicate a subsection
 Flag of the Republic of the Rio Grande, nicknamed the Three Star Flag
 Georgia's Own Credit Union 3 Stars of the Year Award, ice hockey award
 Order of the Three Stars, Latvian decoration for merit in service
 Samsung, which means "Three stars" in Korean
 The three-star rating system, used within certain video games

In music
 "Three Stars" (song), a 1959 song written by Tommy Dee
 "Theme from Dr. Kildare (Three Stars Will Shine Tonight)", a TV show theme and 1962 single

See also
Tristar (disambiguation)

*** (disambiguation), three asterisks